Bernardo da Velha (born January 29, 1942) is a Bissau-Guinean-born Portuguese former footballer who played as a defender and a football manager.

Career  
Velha began playing at the youth level with Sporting Lisboa in 1962. He played in the Primeira Divisão in 1964 with FC Porto. He would feature in the 1968 Taça de Portugal Final, and assisted in securing the Taça de Portugal for Porto. Throughout his tenure with Porto he played in the 1968–69 European Cup Winners' Cup against Slovan Bratislava, and Cardiff City. In 1969, he signed with league rivals Vitória S.C. where he played for two seasons. He also appeared in the 1969–70 Inter-Cities Fairs Cup, and 1970–71 Inter-Cities Fairs Cup.

In 1971, he played with Boavista F.C. for three seasons, and later with S.C. Espinho, and Leixões S.C. In 1978, he played abroad in the National Soccer League with Toronto First Portuguese. In 1981, he was named the head coach for Toronto First Portuguese.

References  

1942 births
Living people
Portuguese footballers
Portuguese football managers
Association football defenders
FC Porto players
Vitória S.C. players
Boavista F.C. players
S.C. Espinho players
Leixões S.C. players
Toronto First Portuguese players
Primeira Liga players
Canadian National Soccer League players
Canadian National Soccer League coaches
Portuguese expatriate footballers
Expatriate soccer players in Canada
Portuguese expatriate sportspeople in Canada